Beppie Melissen (born 26 May 1951) is a Dutch actress. She won the Golden Calf for Best Actress award for her role in the 2019 drama film Romy's Salon.

Career 

Melissen is known for her role of Cor Hogenbirk in the television series Gooische Vrouwen, the 2011 film Gooische Vrouwen and the 2014 film Gooische Vrouwen 2. For her role in the film Gooische Vrouwen she won the Golden Calf Award for Best Supporting Actress. In 2012, Melissen also hosted the spin-off talk show Villa Morero with Peter Paul Muller and they both interviewed, in character, two guests in each episode. The show was not very successful and did not get a second season.

In 2020, she won the Golden Calf for Best Actress award for her role in the 2019 drama film Romy's Salon.

Awards 

 2011: Golden Calf Award for Best Supporting Actress, Gooische Vrouwen
 2020: Golden Calf for Best Actress, Romy's Salon

Selected filmography 

 1992: The Pocket-knife
 1996: Punk Lawyer
 2008: Vox populi
 2011: The Heineken Kidnapping
 2022: Zwanger & Co
 2023: Rocco & Sjuul (upcoming)

References

External links 
 

1951 births
Living people
Dutch film actresses
Dutch television actresses
Golden Calf winners
20th-century Dutch actresses
21st-century Dutch actresses